The men's large hill individual ski jumping competition for the 1980 Winter Olympics was held in Lake Placid Olympic Ski Jumping Complex. It occurred on 23 February.

Results

References

Ski jumping at the 1980 Winter Olympics